Juan Ramón Alsina Klingler (born 15 November 1989) is a Uruguayan professional footballer who plays as a centre-back.

Club career
Alsina began his career in his homeland with Huracán Buceo, making twelve appearances in three years from 2007; initially in the Segunda División, before relegation in the 2008–09 campaign. In 2010, Sud América completed the signing of Alsina. After three seasons in the second tier, they won promotion to the Primera División as champions in 2012–13. His first top-flight match arrived on 30 November 2013 during a 1–1 draw versus Defensor Sporting. Thirty appearances later, in January 2016, Alsina moved to Primera B Nacional on loan with Villa Dálmine. His stint lasted the 2016 and 2016–17 seasons, appearing fifty-seven times.

Having gone back to Sud América, he appeared for the club for the rest of the 2017 Primera División season as they suffered relegation to the Segunda División. Top tier Liverpool subsequently signed Alsina, with the defender participating in the first of six fixtures in February versus Cerro. On 8 August 2018, Alsina returned to Argentina by agreeing a move to Guillermo Brown. He made his debut in a loss to Brown on 26 August. Alsina scored his first goal for them on 31 March 2019 against Deportivo Morón. After eighteen games for Guillermo Brown, Alsina headed off to Indonesia in August 2019 to join Liga 1 side Borneo.

During his time in Asia, Alsina scored one goal (versus Persija) in seventeen league matches for Borneo. In early 2020, Alsina returned to Argentina with Alvarado.

International career
Alsina represented Uruguay at U20 level, including in a friendly against Mexico on 15 May 2008.

Career statistics
.

Honours
Sud América
Segunda División: 2012–13

References

External links

1989 births
Living people
Footballers from Montevideo
Uruguayan footballers
Uruguay youth international footballers
Uruguay under-20 international footballers
Association football defenders
Uruguayan expatriate footballers
Expatriate footballers in Argentina
Expatriate footballers in Indonesia
Uruguayan expatriate sportspeople in Argentina
Uruguayan expatriate sportspeople in Indonesia
Uruguayan Segunda División players
Uruguayan Primera División players
Primera Nacional players
Liga 1 (Indonesia) players
Huracán Buceo players
Sud América players
Villa Dálmine footballers
Liverpool F.C. (Montevideo) players
Guillermo Brown footballers
Borneo F.C. players
Club Atlético Alvarado players